This article lists the orders of the Fungi.

Phylogeny
Phylogeny of Fungi.

Subkingdom Rozellomyceta

Division Rozellomycota

Class Rozellomycetes
 Order Rozellida Li, Heath & Packer 1993

Division Microsporidiomycota

Class Chytridiopsidea
 Order Chytridiopsida Weiser 1974

Class Metchnikovellea
 Order Metchnikovellida Vivier 1977

Class Microsporidea
 Order Amblyosporida Tokarev & Issi 2020
 Order Glugeida Issi 1986
 Order Neopereziida Tokarev & Issi 2020
 Order Nosematida Labbé 1899
 Order Ovavesiculida Tokarev & Issi 2020

Subkingdom Aphelidiomyceta

Division Aphelidiomycota

Class Aphelidiomycetes
 Order Aphelidiales Tedersoo et al. 2018

Subkingdom Chytridiomyceta

Division Blastocladiomycota

Class Physodermatomycetes
 Order Physodermatales Cavalier-Smith 2012

Class Blastocladiomycetes
 Order Blastocladiales Petersen 1909
 Order Callimastigales Doweld 2014
 Order Catenomycetales Doweld 2014

Division Neocallimastigomycota

Class Neocallimastigomycetes
 Order Neocallimastigales Li, Heath & Packer 1993

Division Monoblepharomycota

Class Hyaloraphidiomycetes
 Order Hyaloraphidiales Doweld 2001

Class Sanchytriomycetes
 Order Sanchytriales Tedersoo et al. 2018

Class Monoblepharidomycetes
 Order Monoblepharidales Schröter 1883

Division Chytridiomycota

Class Coenomycetes
 Order Coenomycetales Doweld 2014

Class Chytridiomycetes
 Order ?Nephridiophagales Doweld 2014
 Order ?Saccopodiales Doweld 2014
 Order ?Zygophlyctidales Seto 2019
 Order Chytridiales Cohn 1879
 Order Cladochytriales Mozley-Standridge 2009
 Order Gromochytriales Karpov & Aleoshin 2014
 Order Lobulomycetales Simmons 2009
 Order Mesochytriales Karpov & Aleoshin 2014
 Order Polyphagales Doweld 2014
 Order Polytrichiales Longcore & Simmons 2012
 Order Rhizophlyctidales Letcher 2007
 Order Rhizophydiales Letcher 2006
 Order Spizellomycetales Barr 1980
 Order Synchytriales Doweld 2014

Subkingdom Zoopagomyceta

Division Caulochytriomycota

Class Caulochytriomycetes
 Order Caulochytriales Doweld 2014

Division Basidiobolomycota

Class Basidiobolomycetes
 Order Basidiobolales Jaczewski & Jaczewski 1931 ex. Cavalier-Smith 2012

Division Olpidiomycota

Class Olpidiomycetes
 Order Olpidiales Cavalier-Smith 2012

Division Entomophthoromycota

Class Neozygitomycetes
 Order Neozygitales Humber 2012

Class Entomophthoromycetes
 Order Entomophthorales Winter 1880

Division Kickxellomycota

Subdivision Zoopagomycotina

Class Zoopagomycetes
 Order Zoopagales Bessey 1950 ex. Benjamin 1979

Subdivision Kickxellomycotina

Kickxellomycotina incertae sedis
 Order Zygnemomycetales Doweld 2014

Class Dimargaritomycetes
 Order Dimargaritales Benjamin 1979

Class Ramicandelaberomycetes
 Order Ramicandelaberales Doweld 2014

Class Kickxellomycetes
 Order ?Orphellales Valle et al. 2018
 Order ?Spiromycetales Doweld 2014
 Order Barbatosporales Doweld 2014
 Order Kickxellales Kreisel 1969 ex. Benjamin 1979
 Subclass Trichomycetalia Cavalier-Smith 1998
 Order Asellariales Manier 1950 ex. Manier & Lichtward  1978
 Order Harpellales Lichtward & Manier 1978

Subkingdom Mucoromyceta

Division Glomeromycota

Class Paraglomeromycetes
 Order Paraglomerales Walker & Schüssler 2001

Class Archaeosporomycetes
 Order Archaeosporales Walker & Schüssler 2001

Class Glomeromycetes
 Order Gigasporales Sieverd. et al. 2011
 Order Glomerales Morton & Benny 1990
 Order Diversisporales Walker & Schüssler 2004

Division Mortierellomycota

Class Mortierellomycetes
 Order Mortierellales Cavalier-Smith 1998

Division Calcarisporiellomycota

Class Calcarisporiellomycetes
 Order Calcarisporiellales Tedersoo et al. 2018

Division Mucoromycota

Class Endogonomycetes
 Order Endogonales Moreau 1954 ex Benjamin 1979

Class Mucoromycetes
 Genus Bifiguratus Torres-Cruz & Porras-Alfaro 2017
 Order Umbelopsidales Spatafora, Stajich & Bonito 2016
 Order Mucorales Fries 1832

Subkingdom Dikarya

Division Entorrhizomycota

Class Entorrhizomycetes
 Order Talbotiomycetales Riess et al. 2015
 Order Entorrhizales Bauer & Oberwinkler

Division Basidiomycota

Subdivision Pucciniomycotina

Class Tritirachiomycetes
 Order Tritirachiales Aime & Schell 2011

Class Mixiomycetes
 Order Mixiales Bauer et al. 2006

Class Spiculogloeomycetes
 Order Spiculogloeales Bauer et al. 2006

Class Agaricostilbomycetes
 Order Agaricostilbales Oberwinkler & Bauer 1989

Class Cystobasidiomycetes
 Order Buckleyzymales Zhao & Hyde 2017
 Order Sakaguchiales Zhao & Hyde 2017
 Order Naohideales Bauer et al.
 Order Cyphobasidiales Spribille & Mayrhofer 2016
 Order Cystobasidiales Bauer et al.
 Order Erythrobasidiales Bauer et al.

Class Microbotryomycetes
 Order Heitmaniales Wang & Bai 2020
 Order Rosettozymales Wang & Bai 2020
 Order Heterogastridiales Oberwinkler & Bauer 1990
 Order Sporidiobolales Sampaio, Weiss & Bauer 2003
 Order Curvibasidiales Doweld 2014
 Order Leucosporidiales Sampaio, Weiss & Bauer 2003
 Order Kriegeriales Toome & Aime 2013
 Order Microbotryales Bauer & Oberwinkler 1997

Class Classiculomycetes
 Order Classiculales Bauer et al. 2003

Class Cryptomycocolacomycetes
 Order Cryptomycocolacales Oberwinkler & Bauer 1990

Class Atractiellomycetes
 Order Attractiellales Oberwinkler & Bandoni 1982

Class Pucciniomycetes

 Order Septobasidiales Couch 1938 ex Donk 1964
 Order Helicobasidiales Bauer et al.
 Order Pachnocybales Bauer et al.
 Order Platygloeales Moore 1900
 Order Pucciniales Clements & Shear 1931

Subdivision Wallemiomycotina

Class Wallemiomycetes
 Order Geminibasidiales Nguyen, Nickerson & Seifert 2013
 Order Wallemiomycetales Zalar, de Hoog & Schroers 2005

Subdivision Ustilaginomycotina

Class Malasseziomycetes
 Order Malasseziales Moore 1980 emend. Begerow, Bauer & Boekhout 2000

Class Exobasidiomycetes
 Subclass Tilletiomycetidae
 Order Tilletiales Kreisel ex Bauer & Oberwinkler 1997
 Order Moniliellales Wang, Bai & Boekhout 2014
 Order Georgefischeriales Bauer, Begerow & Oberwinkler 1997
 Subclass Exobasidiomycetidae
 Order Golubeviales Wang et al. 2015
 Order Robbauerales Wang et al. 2015
 Order Microstromatales Bauer & Oberwinkler 1997
 Order Doassansiales Bauer & Oberwinkler 1997
 Order Ceraceosorales Begerow, Stoll & Bauer 2006
 Order Entylomatales Bauer & Oberwinkler 1997
 Order Exobasidiales Henssen 1898 em. Bauer & Oberwinkler

Class Ustilaginomycetes
 Order Cintractiellales McTaggart & Shivas 2020
 Order Uleiellales Garnica et al. 2016
 Order Violaceomycetales Albu, Toome & Aime 2015
 Order Urocystales Bauer & Oberwinkler 1997
 Order Ustilaginales Beketov 1864 em. Bauer & Oberwinkler

Subdivision Agaricomycotina

Class Bartheletiomycetes
 Order Bartheletiales Thines 2017

Class Tremellomycetes
 Order Cystofilobasidiales Fell, Roeijmans & Boekhout 1999
 Order Filobasidiales Jülich 1981
 Order Holtermanniales Libkind et al. 2010
 Order Trichosporonales Boekhout & Fell 2001
 Order Tremellales Fries 1821

Class Dacrymycetes
 Order Dacrymycetales Tokum. & Oberwinkler 2013
 Order Dacrymycetales Henn. 1897

Class Agaricomycetes
 Subclass Cantharellomycetidae Hibbett 2005
 Order Cantharellales Gäumann 1936
 Order Sebacinales Weiss et al. 2004
 Subclass Auriculariomycetidae Jülich 1981
 Order Trechisporales Larsson 2007
 Order Auriculariales Schröter 1897
 Subclass Hymenochaetomycetidae Vizzini 2004
 Order Hymenochaetales Oberwinkler 1977
 Subclass Thelephoromycetidae Locquin 1984
 Order Corticiales Larsson 2007
 Order Russulales Kreisel 1969 ex Kirk, Cannon & David 2001
 Order Thelephorales Corner ex Oberwinkler 1976
 Order Polyporales Gäumann 1926
 Subclass Phallomycetidae Hosaka, Castellano & Spatafora 2007
 Order Gloeophyllales Thorn 2007
 Order Stereopsidales Sjkvistet al. 2014
 Order Geastrales Hosaka & Castellano 2006
 Order Gomphales Jülich 1981
 Order Hysterangiales 
 Order Phallales E. Fisch. 1898
 Subclass Agaricomycetidae Locquin 1984 ex Parmasto 1986
 Order Lepidostromatales Hodkinson & Lücking 2014
 Order Tremellodendropsidales Vizzini 2014
 Order Jaapiales Manfr. Binder, Larsson & Hibbett 2010
 Order Boletales Gilbert 1931
 Order Atheliales Jülich 1981
 Order Amylocorticiales Larsson, Manfr. Binder & Hibbett 2010
 Order Agaricales Underwood 1899

Division Ascomycota

Subdivision Taphrinomycotina

Class Archaeorhizomycetes
 Order Archaeorhizomycetales Rosling & James 2011

Class Neolectomycetes
 Order Neolectales Landvik et al. 1993

Class Pneumocystidomycetes
 Order Pneumocystidales Eriksson 1994

Class Schizosaccharomycetes
 Order Schizosaccharomycetales Eriksson & Winka 1997

Class Taphrinomycetes
 Order Taphrinales Gaum. & Dodge 1928

Subdivision Saccharomycotina

Class Saccharomycetes
 Order Saccharomycetales Kudrjanzev 1960

Subdivision Pezizomycotina

Pezizomycotina incertae sedis
 Order Thelocarpales Lücking & Lumbsch 2016
 Order Vezdaeales Lücking & Lumbsch 2016

Class Sareomycetes
 Order Sareales Beimforde et al. 2020

Class Pezizomycetes
 Order Pezizales Schröter 1894
 Family Caloscyphaceae Harmaja 2002
 Order Tuberales Dumortier 1829 ex Winter 1884
 Order Pyronematales

Class Orbiliomycetes
 Order Orbiliales Baral et al. 2003

Class Geoglossomycetes
 Order Geoglossales Wang, Schoch & Spatafora 2009

Class Candelariomycetes
 Order Candelariales

Class Coniocybomycetes
 Order Coniocybales

Class Lichinomycetes
 Order Lichinales

Class Lecanoromycetes
 Order Micropeltidales
 Order Turquoiseomycetales
 Subclass Acarosporomycetidae
 Order Acarosporales
 Subclass Ostropomycetidae
 Order Thelenellales
 Order Schaereriales
 Order Sarrameanales
 Order Pertusariales [Agyriales]
 Order Baeomycetales
 Order Ostropales 
 Order Gyalectales (Trichotheliales)
 Order Graphidales
 Subclass Umbilicariomycetidae
 Order Umbilicariales
 Subclass Lecanoromycetidae
 Order Sporastatiales
 Order Rhizocarpales
 Order Lecideales
 Order Peltigerales
 Order Caliciales
 Order Leprocaulales
 Order Teloschistales
 Order Lecanorales

Class Arthoniomycetes
 Order Lichenostigmatales
 Order Arthoniales

Class Dothideomycetes
 Order Catinellales
 Order Cladoriellales
 Order Collemopsidiales
 Order Eremithallales
 Order Eremomycetales
 Order Gloniales
 Order Lembosinales
 Order Lichenotheliales
 Order Lineolatales
 Order Murramarangomycetales
 Order Parmulariales
 Subclass Dothideomycetidae
 Order Myriangiales
 Order Dothideales
 Order Capnodiales
 Subclass Pleosporomycetidae
 Order Aulographales
 Order Strigulales
 Order Acrospermales
 Order Stigmatodiscales
 Order Monoblastiales
 Order Dyfrolomycetales
 Order Muyocopronales
 Order Phaeotrichales
 Order Natipusillales
 Order Zeloasperisporiales
 Order Microthyriales
 Order Venturiales
 Order Abrothallales
 Order Asterinales
 Order Kirschsteiniotheliales
 Order Patellariales
 Order Tubeufiales
 Order Superstratomycetales
 Order Valsariales
 Order Trypetheliales
 Order Botryosphaeriales
 Order Jahnulales
 Order Minutisphaerales
 Order Mytilinidiales
 Order Hysteriales
 Order Pleosporales

Class Xylobotryomycetes
 Order Xylobotryales

Class Eurotiomycetes
 Subclass Mycocaliciomycetidae
 Order Mycocaliciales
 Subclass Sclerococcomycetidae
 Order Sclerococcales
 Subclass Chaetothyriomycetidae
 Order Pyrenulales
 Order Phaeomoniellales 
 Order Verrucariales
 Order Chaetothyriales
 Subclass Eurotiomycetidae
 Order Coryneliales
 Order Eurotiales
 Order Arachnomycetales
 Order Onygenales

Class Xylonomycetes
 Order Xylonomycetales

Class Leotiomycetes
 Order Lahmiales
 Order Lauriomycetales
 Order Lichinodiales
 Order Marthamycetales
 Order Micraspidales
 Order Leotiales
 Order Phacidiales
 Order Rhytismatales
 Order Medeolariales
 Order Cyttariales
 Order Chaetomellales
 Order Thelebolales
 Order Helotiales

Class Laboulbeniomycetes
 Order Herpomycetales
 Order Laboulbeniales
 Order Pixidiophorales

Class Sordariomycetes
 Order ?Parasympodiellales
 Order ?Tracyllalales
 Order ?Vermiculariopsiellales
 Subclass Xylariomycetidae
 Order Delonicicolales
 Order Amphisphaeriales
 Order Xylariales
 Subclass Hypocreomycetidae
 Order Jobellisiales
 Order Pararamichloridiales
 Order Pisorisporiales
 Order Koralionastetales
 Order Spathulosporales
 Order Lulworthiales
 Order Torpedosporales
 Order Falcocladiales
 Order Coronophorales (Melanosporales)
 Order Fuscosporellales
 Order Conioscyphales
 Order Savoryellales
 Order Pleurotheciales
 Order Hypocreales
 Order Glomerellales
 Order Microascales [Halosphaeriales]
 Subclass Sordariomycetidae
 Order Batistiales
 Order Cephalothecales
 Order Paradiplococciales
 Order Pseudodactylariales
 Order Coniochaetales
 Order Sordariales
 Order Boliniales
 Order Meliolales
 Order Chaetosphaeriales
 Order Phyllachorales
 Subclass Sordariomycetidae
 Order Amplistromatales
 Order Atractosporales
 Order Distoseptisporales
 Order Myrmecridiales
 Order Sporidesmiales
 Order Tirisporellales
 Order Trichosphaeriales
 Order Xenospadicoidales
 Order Magnaporthales
 Order Phomatosporales
 Order Annulatascales
 Order Ophiostomatales
 Order Togniniales
 Order Calosphaeriales
 Order Diaporthales

References

Fungal orders